(+)-α-Barbatene synthase (EC 4.2.3.69, AtBS) is an enzyme with systematic name (2E,6E)-farnesyl-diphosphate diphosphate-lyase ((+)-α-barbatene-forming). This enzyme catalyses the following chemical reaction

 (2E,6E)-farnesyl diphosphate  (+)-α-barbatene + diphosphate

The recombinant enzyme from the plant Arabidopsis thaliana produces α-barbatene, thujopsene and β-chamigrene.

References

External links 
 

EC 4.2.3